The Concept of Justice: Is Social Justice Just? is a book on justice and social justice by Thomas Patrick Burke, published in 2011 by Continuum International. The book has received reviews from journals including The Journal of Politics, Cato Journal, and Modern Age, along with being widely cited in its field.

See also 
 The Major Religions, another book by Burke

References 

2011 non-fiction books
Social justice
Continuum International Publishing Group books